Events in the year 1824 in Art.

Events
April 2 – The British government buys John Julius Angerstein's art collection for £60,000 for the purpose of establishing a National Gallery in London which opens to the public in his former townhouse on May 10.
 The Vow of Louis XIII, painted by Jean Auguste Dominique Ingres for the cathedral of Montauban, is exhibited at the Paris Salon.
 The Hay Wain by John Constable is one of three of the artist's paintings also exhibited at the Paris Salon and wins a gold medal.
 Caspar David Friedrich enters a depressive episode.
 Edwin Landseer visits Scotland for the first time to paint a portrait of Sir Walter Scott; he will return annually, concentrating on animal portraits.
 A National Gallery of Naval Art is created in the Painted Hall of Greenwich Hospital, London.

Works

 François Joseph Bosio – Statue of Henry IV of France as a child (Louvre)
 Léon Cogniet – Marius among the Ruins of Carthage
 Louis Daguerre – The Ruins of Holyrood Chapel (approx. date)
 Jacques-Louis David – Mars Being Disarmed by Venus
 Eugène Delacroix
 The Massacre at Chios
 Orphan Girl at the Cemetery (c. 1823 or 1824)
 John Flaxman – Pastoral Apollo
 Caspar David Friedrich – The Sea of Ice
 François Gérard – Daphnis and Chloe
 Jean-Baptiste Paulin Guérin – Ulysses and Minerva
 John Hayter – Kamāmalu, Queen Consort of Hawaii
 Frederick Yeates Hurlstone – A Venetian Page
 Jean Auguste Dominique Ingres – Vow of Louis XIII
 Alexander Andreyevich Ivanov
 Cleansing of the Temple
 Transfiguration
 Edwin Landseer – Lion, A Newfoundland Dog
 Johann Friedrich Overbeck – Christ's Entry into Jerusalem
 Jan Willem Pieneman – The Battle of Waterloo 
 John Trumbull – General George Washington Resigning His Commission
 J. M. W. Turner – The Battle of Trafalgar

Awards
 Grand Prix de Rome, painting:
 Grand Prix de Rome, sculpture: Charles Seurre, sculptor.
 Grand Prix de Rome, architecture: Henri Labrouste.
 Grand Prix de Rome, engraving:
 Grand Prix de Rome, music: Auguste Barbereau.

Births
January 27 – Jozef Israëls, Dutch painter (died 1911)
March 31 – William Morris Hunt, American painter (died 1879)
May 11 – Jean-Léon Gérôme, French painter and sculptor (died 1904)
June 12 – Albert-Ernest Carrier-Belleuse, French sculptor and painter (died 1887)
July 12 – Eugène Boudin, French painter (died 1898)
 August 26 – Martha Darley Mutrie, British painter (died 1885)
October 14 – Adolphe Joseph Thomas Monticelli, French painter (died 1886)
October 30 – Christen Dalsgaard, Danish genre painter (died 1907)
December 6 – Emmanuel Frémiet, French sculptor (died 1910)
December 10 – Aasta Hansteen, Norwegian painter, writer and early feminist (died 1908)
December 14 – Pierre Puvis de Chavannes, French painter (died 1898)

Deaths
January 26 – Théodore Géricault, French painter and lithographer, pioneer of the Romantic movement  (born 1791)
January 28 – George Mills, British sculptor, engraver and medallist (born 1792/1793) 
April 17 – William Ashford, British landscape painter working exclusively in Ireland (born 1746)
September 12 – Louis Albert Guislain Bacler d'Albe, French artist, map-maker and close strategic advisor of Napoleon (born 1761)
November 23 – Fyodor Alekseyev, Russian painter of landscape art (born 1753)
December 9 – Anne-Louis Girodet de Roussy-Trioson, French painter (born 1767)
December 24 
 John Downman, English portrait painter (born 1750)
 Antoine Vestier, French miniaturist and painter of portraits (born 1740)
 date unknown
 François-Anne David, French line-engraver (born 1741)
 Thomas Hickey, Irish painter of portraits and genre scenes (born 1741)

References

 
Years of the 19th century in art
1820s in art